The House of Loredan-Santo Stefano was a cadet branch of the House of Loredan that existed from the 14th century until 1767. The branch was mainly settled in the Palazzo Loredan in Campo Santo Stefano, which they acquired in 1536 from the Mocenigo family. The progenitor of the branch is considered to be Gerolamo Loredan "dal Barbaro" di S. Vitale (d.~1474), father of Doge Leonardo Loredan and Dogaressa Caterina Loredan. Besides Leonardo, the branch also gave Doge Francesco Loredan.

History 
The progenitor of the family is considered to be Gerolamo Loredan di S. Vitale (d.~1474), known as "dal Barbaro", who served as the podestà of Padua. He married Donata Donà di Natale and their children were Doge Leonardo Loredan and Dogaressa Caterina Loredan, as well as Pietro Loredan (1466-1510), of poor health and unstable character, who studied alchemy in Padua and was disinterested in politics. In the will drawn up in February 1474 in Padua where he was podestà, the father designated Leonardo as the executor of the will and the sole heir of the estate and granted Pietro an annual annuity of 250 ducats. Their sister, Caterina Loredan, who later became Dogaressa of Venice by marriage to Doge Antonio Grimani, was described in a book by Edgcumbe Staley: “The Loredanian tradition for patriotism and nobility was handed on in the gracious personage of Dogaressa Caterina Loredan, sister of Doge Leonardo Loredan – the Consort of his successor Doge Antonio Grimani.”

In 1461, Leonardo Loredan married Giustina Giustiniani, of the wealthy branch of S. Moisè, with whom he had nine children: Lorenzo (who became Procurator of St. Mark's), Girolamo (the only one to continue the branch), Alvise, Vincenzo (died in Tripoli in 1499), Bernardo, Donata, Maria (wife of Giovanni Venier, of the branch that gave birth to Doge Francesco Venier), Paola (wife of Giovanni Alvise Venier, descendant of Doge Antonio Venier), and Elisabetta.

The main line of the branch of Santo Stefano ended in 1750 with Andrea di Girolamo Loredan, who died young in 1750, and the branch became extinct in 1767 with the death of Giovanni Loredan, brother of Doge Francesco.

Genealogy 

Note:  The branch of Santo Stefano is also known as the branch of San Vidal (San Vitale).

Note: There are some generations missing between Girolamo Loredan (1468-1532) and Francesco Loredan (17th century).

Note: Giustina Giustiniani (d. 1500), the wife of Doge Leonardo Loredan (1436-1521), is also known as Morosina Giustiniani.

Note: Caterina Loredan, Dogaressa of Venice, is featured in the family tree as the daughter of Gerolamo Loredan (d. 1474) and Donata Donà because, in some sources, she is mentioned as the sister of Doge Leonardo Loredan (1436-1521), although she may have been a daughter of Domenico Loredan.

Interestingly, near the Palazzo Contarini-Sceriman and the nearby bridge, Leonardo Loredan (d. 1675) was found dead in a boat. The unexplained death was the source of many rumors, claiming accidental death, murder by relatives, or murder by the Inquisitors of the Republic.

Andrea Loredan (d. 1750) died young, thus ending the male (agnatic) line of the branch of Santo Stefano.

Istria

Barban and Rakalj 
On the 23rd of December, 1535, the Loredan family acquired the town of Barban in Istria (today part of Croatia) for 14,760 ducats, and ownership was held by the brothers Leonardo, Lorenzo and Francesco, of the Santo Stefano branch. At the time, Barban also included Rakalj, and the two territories were organized as a separate feud owned by the Loredan family, who owned it until the abolition of feudal rights in 1869.

The Loredan Terminations 
“The Loredan Terminations” were written orders of the Loredan family. They were created for the purpose of communication between the masters who were in Venice and the family representatives in Istria. From them we can learn about the internal structure of the feud. The captain had political and judicial power, and was appointed by the Loredans. He had to reside permanently on the estate and participate in the election of prefects, deputy prefects and other officials. He had a chancellor who recorded all the documents in special books, and he also took care of the distribution of grain. Twelve judges, the prefect and the deputy prefect took care of the supply, solved smaller disputes and imposed lesser sentences. Church and fraternal goods were managed by the gastald and the municipal money was collected by the chamberlain.

The Terminations are kept in the Croatian State Archives in Rijeka.

Palazzo Loredan in Campo Santo Stefano 
{
  "type": "FeatureCollection",
  "features": [
    {
      "type": "Feature",
      "properties": {},
      "geometry": {
        "type": "Point",
        "coordinates": [
          12.329977355984742,
          45.43302963278539
        ]
      }
    }
  ]
}Palazzo Loredan in Campo Santo Stefano, where the branch was settled, is a palace in the San Marco district of Venice, overlooking Campo Santo Stefano. 

Before the acquisition by the Loredan family in 1536 and the restoration by the architect Antonio Abbondi, it was a group of adjacent buildings, in the Gothic style, belonging to the Mocenigo family. The purchased buildings were substantially restored and made into a single building for the residence of the Loredan family.

After the fall of the Republic of Venice, a Loredan heir sold the building to a businessman around 1802–1805.

Today, the palace is the seat of the Venetian Institute of Science, Literature and Arts and it houses the Panteon Veneto, a collection of sculptures of great Venetians.

Family in art

In painting

In sculpture

References 

L